Operation Eagle was a 2011–2012 Egyptian military campaign in the Sinai Peninsula.

Operation Eagle may also refer to:

 Operation Eagle (Portugal), a 1965 military operation in Mozambique
 Operation Eagle (Sri Lanka), a 1990 Sri Lanka Air Force rescue mission

See also
 Operation Eagle Assist (2001)
 Operation Eagle Attack (1940)
 Operation Eagle Claw (1980)
 Operation Eagle Curtain (2003)
 Operation Eagle Dive I (2007)
 Operation Eagle Eye (disambiguation)
 Operation Eagle Fury (2003)
 Operation Eagle Guardian (2010)
 Operation Eagle Lightning (2007)
 Operation Eagle Pull (1975)
 Operation Eagle's Summit (2008)
 Operation Eagle Sweep (2007)
 Operation Eagle Talon (2007)
 Operation Eagle Venture IV (2007)
 Operation Eagle Watch (2006)